Sonda was a Polish television popular science series broadcast between 1977 and 1989. It was presented by economist Zdzisław Kamiński and physicist Andrzej Kurek. During the period of 12 years of broadcasting, the programme was the most popular and appreciated science TV show in Poland, becoming cult viewing for a generation. The program ended with the death of its hosts in a car accident on September 29, 1989.

The programme owes its popularity to its unique formula: in each episode, one particular problem from the field of science or technology was addressed. The show had the form of a “never-ending” discussion between a sceptic and an enthusiast (Kamiński and Kurek), who carried out hands-on demonstrations and experiments to illustrate their arguments. The discussion contained elements of humour and performance: the hosts were often dressed up in costumes. The show was interspersed with documentary footage presenting a broader view of the issues discussed.

Production
A total of 529 episodes were broadcast. Most of the broadcast tapes have been erased (reused for newer episodes).

The programme is notable for its use of music, much of it by electronic music artists such as Vangelis and Jean-Michel Jarre, or by artists associated with the Sonoton Production Music Library label. The theme tune was a slightly shortened version of an instrumental piece called "Visitation", composed and recorded in 1971 by Mike Vickers (a former member of Manfred Mann).

The opening and end titles of later editions were prepared by Kurek using his ZX Spectrum.

External links 
 Official page of "Sonda", author: Tomasz Pyć (one of creators of the program) 
 The surviving episodes of Sonda

Polish educational television series
Non-fiction television series
1970s Polish television series
1980s Polish television series
1977 Polish television series debuts
1989 Polish television series endings
Telewizja Polska original programming